In the Sciences
 Bioreactor, a device which controls a biologically active environment.
 Chemical reactor, a device for containing and controlling a chemical reaction
 Fusion reactor, a device for containing and controlling a fusion power reaction
 An inductor (possessing reactance) in an electrical power grid
 A current limiting reactor is used to limit starting current of motors and to protect variable frequency drives
 Nuclear reactor, a device for containing and controlling a nuclear reaction
 Reactor (software), a physics simulation engine

In Software Engineering
 The reactor design pattern, a design pattern used in concurrent programming
 Reactor, A library for Java and other JVM-based languages that provides a framework for programs that are based on the reactor design pattern.  

In entertainment
 Reactor an alternative title for the 1978 Italian film War of the Robots directed by Alfonso Brescia
 Reactor (film), an American action thriller film starring Bruce Willis
 Re·ac·tor, a 1981 album by Neil Young and Crazy Horse
 Reactor (arcade game), an arcade game created by Gottlieb
 Reactor, Inc., a defunct interactive entertainment company founded by Mike Saenz
 Reactor, a comedy series hosted by David Huntsberger on Syfy
 The Reactor (show rod), a show car built by Gene Winfield

External links